The 2014 Corpus Christi Fury season was the 12th season for the franchise, and their second as a member of the Ultimate Indoor Football League (UIFL).

Schedule
Key:

Regular season
All start times are local to home team

Postseason

Standings

y - clinched conference title
x - clinched playoff spot

Roster

References

Corpus Christi Fury
Corpus Christi Fury